Laura van den Berg is an American fiction writer. She is the author of five works of fiction. Her first two collections of short stories were each shortlisted for the Frank O'Connor International Short Story Award, in 2010 and 2014. In 2021, she was awarded the Strauss Livings Award from the American Academy of Arts & Letters and a Guggenheim Fellowship.

Biography
Laura van den Berg was born and raised in Florida. She has a BA from Rollins College (2005) and an M.F.A. from Emerson College. Her stories have been published in The Paris Review, McSweeney's, BOMB, Virginia Quarterly Review, Conjunctions, American Short Fiction, Ploughshares, Glimmer Train and One Story.

Her first collection of short stories, What the World Will Look Like When All the Water Leaves Us, was published in 2009, and her second collection, The Isle of Youth, was published in 2013. A third short story collection, I Hold a Wolf By the Ears, was published in 2020.

Her other books include two novels, Find Me (2015) and The Third Hotel (2018), which was a finalist for the Young Lions Fiction Award. van den Berg has also published a chapbook of flash fiction, There Will Be No More Good Nights Without Good Nights (2012).

Van den Berg lives in Cambridge, Massachusetts with her husband, Paul Yoon.

Awards and honors

2010 The Story Prize longlist for What the World Will Look Like When All the Water Leaves Us
2010 Frank O'Connor International Short Story Award shortlist for What the World Will Look Like When All the Water Leaves Us
2014 Frank O'Connor International Short Story Award shortlist for The Isle of Youth
2014 American Academy of Arts and Letters Rosenthal Family Foundation Award winner for The Isle of Youth
2019 Young Lions Fiction Award shortlist 
2021 American Academy of Arts and Letters Strauss Livings Award 
2021 Guggenheim Fellowship.

Selected works
What the World Will Look Like When All the Water Leaves Us, Dzanc Books (2009)
There Will Be No More Good Nights Without Good Nights, Origami Zoo Press / Bull City Press, (2012)
The Isle of Youth, Farrar, Straus and Giroux, (2013)
Find Me, Farrar, Straus and Giroux, (2015), novel
The Third Hotel, Farrar, Straus and Giroux, 2018, 
I Hold a Wolf by the Ears, Farrar, Straus and Giroux, 2020,

References

External links 
Van den Berg's website

1983 births
Living people
American women short story writers
21st-century American novelists
21st-century American women writers
Novelists from Florida
Emerson College alumni
American women novelists
Rollins College alumni
21st-century American short story writers
Harvard University faculty
American women academics
O. Henry Award winners